"Hot Sugar" is a song by American singer Tamar Braxton. It was released on October 17, 2013 as the fourth single from her second studio album, Love and War (2013). American producer Kyle "K2" Stewart II wrote "Hot Sugar" in collaboration with Braxton and songwriters LaShawn Daniels and Makeba Riddick. Media outlets had varying opinions on the song's genre, with commentators associating it with club music, dance music, or funk. The lyrics revolve around maintaining a relationship with a partner.

Critical response to "Hot Sugar" was mixed; some critics praised its sound while others negatively compared it to the album's ballads. It peaked within the top 50 on Billboard Hot R&B/Hip-Hop Songs and R&B/Hip-Hop Digital Songs charts, as well as within the top 20 on the Hot R&B Songs chart. In the accompanying music video, Braxton performs in an Instagram-like social media platform ("Tamartiangram"). Critical response to the visual was mixed, and it received comparisons to videos by American singer Beyoncé. Braxton responded that the directors Steve Gomillion and Dennis Leupold abandoned the project, forcing her to hire a new team of editors to complete it. She has performed the song live on various occasions following its release.

Release and composition 

Kyle "K2" Stewart II produced "Hot Sugar", and wrote it alongside Tamar Braxton, Makeba Riddick, and LaShawn Daniels. Mike Donaldson recorded and mixed the music. "Hot Sugar" was released as a single from Braxton's second studio album Love and War (2013). In an interview with Essence, Braxton said that she originally pushed for the song to be the lead single from the album. She chose to release the 2012 song "Love and War" instead due to its connection with her then-husband Vincent Herbert.

Music critics had varying opinions on the song's genre. A writer for Rap-Up described it as a "ratchet club banger", while Kevin C. Johnson of the St. Louis Post-Dispatch cited it as one of the album's "silly dance numbers". Idolator's Mike Wass referenced it as an "upbeat, funk-heavy track". When performing the single, Braxton said its lyrics focus on how to maintain a romantic relationship. She explained: "Ladies and gents, that's how you get 'em, keeping 'em is a different story." Some of the lyrics include: “Give your man what he dreamin’ about.” In the hook, Braxton sings: "He want that sugar."

Reception 
Critics had a mixed response to "Hot Sugar". Ebony chose it as one of their favorite tracks, alongside "Love and War" and  "The One", when Braxton and Herbert played it for the magazine. Praising the song as "smoothly sexy", Rick Florino of Artistdirect referred to it as a sign that "[the singer] knows how to have fun". Media outlets described "Hot Sugar" as a fan favorite. However, Shehnaz Khan of Yahoo! News criticized it, along with the album's other uptempo tracks, for "ruin[ing] the dynamic of the album"; Khan said it was "debatably skip worthy". Describing the song as "mind-numbing", AllMusic's Andy Kellman wrote that it was "no match for the fully formed songs that seemed rooted in Braxton's life experiences".

Commercially, "Hot Sugar" appeared on several Billboard charts. It peaked at number 48 on the Hot R&B/Hip-Hop Songs chart, lasting one week. On the Hot R&B Songs chart, it reached number 13 and remained for three editions, while peaking at position 44 on the R&B/Hip-Hop Digital Songs chart before leaving.

Music video

Development and synopsis 
Prior to the music video's release, Braxton described it as having “a lot of fashion moments, a lot of life moments", and said that "it’s very necessary.” She explained: "I want it to be sexy and I wanted to remind you of hot sugar and I think that is what we did." On August 28, 2013, Braxton posted a preview was posted on her Instagram account. The music video premiered on 106 & Park on October 17, 2013; it was the third video shot and released from the album. Steve Gomillion and Dennis Leupold directed it.

Throughout the video, Braxton performs in a version of Instagram known as "Tamartiangram". In the social media platform, she is seen "posing and sensual dancing simultaneously within multiple screens". She is accompanied by a group of shirtless male dancers,  who are wearing leather, skirts, and high heals. The singer is shown wearing a leather top and a long ponytail. While lying on a floor, Braxton repeatedly whips her hair back and forth, while the male dancers kick up the legs in unison. In another scene, she helps one of her back-up dancer complete a stretch. Critics compared the video's styling to Beyoncé's visual for the 2007 single "Green Light".

Reception and Braxton's response 
The video received mixed responses from critics. Mike Wass praised its concept as "fun and original", and Derrick Bryson Taylor of Essence wrote that it was "certainly a scorcher". Other media outlets were less positive. Kevin Apaza of Direct Lyrics referenced the visual as "low-budget". The singer's choreography, specifically when she whipped her hair around, was criticized as poorly done. Afiya Augustine of Wetpaint felt that the visual was "a first draft than a final copy", and panned the transitions between scenes and the emphasis on the back-up dancers over Braxton. Fans also had a mixed reaction to the video.

In response to the criticism, Braxton posted on her Instagram account that Gomillion and Leupold had abandoned the production of the video in favor of working with Rihanna during her Diamonds World Tour. She wrote that she had to hire a new team to edit and complete the visual. According to Braxton, Gomillion and Leupold did not promote it through their social media accounts. Her posts were later taken down from her account.

Live performances 
In 2012, Braxton first sang "Hot Sugar" on the reality television series Tamar & Vince. On July 29, 2013, she performed it during a showcase in Los Angeles, while accompanied by a group of back-up dancers. While Mike Wass praised the concert as a whole, he was critical of the way that she ended her performance; he criticized how "[she] ran off stage without so much as taking a bow". The song was also included on the set list of the Love and War Tour. During her performance in Atlanta, Tamar's sisters Towanda Braxton, Traci Braxton and Trina Braxton surprised her by jumping on stage and performing choreography for "Hot Sugar". It was shown in an episode of Braxton Family Values. Braxton also sang "Hot Sugar" as the opening act for John Legend's Love in The Future World Tour. Gene Stout of The Seattle Times described it as a "saucy version" of the song.

Credits and personnel 
Credits adapted from the liner notes of Love and War.
Songwriter – Tamar Braxton, Makeba Riddick, Kyle "K2" Stewart II, and LaShawn Daniels.
Producer – Kyle "K2" Stewart II
Mixing engineer – Mike Donaldson

Charts

Notes

References 

2012 songs
2013 singles
Epic Records singles
Songs written by LaShawn Daniels
Songs written by Makeba Riddick
Songs written by Tamar Braxton
Tamar Braxton songs